Eunidiini is a tribe of longhorn beetles of the subfamily Lamiinae. It was described by Téocchi et al. in 2010.

Taxonomy
 Eunidia Erichson, 1843
 Eunidiopsis Breuning, 1939

References

 
Lamiinae